Lincoln's climbing salamander (Bolitoglossa lincolni) is a species of salamander in the family Plethodontidae.
It is found in Guatemala and Mexico.
Its natural habitat is subtropical or tropical moist montane forests.
It is threatened by habitat loss.

References

Bolitoglossa
Taxonomy articles created by Polbot
Amphibians described in 1943